IBM Watson Media (formerly Ustream and IBM Cloud Video) is an American virtual events platform company which is a division of IBM. Prior to IBM acquisition, it had more than 180 employees across San Francisco, Los Angeles, and Budapest offices. Ustream had received $11.1  million in Series A funding for new product development from Doll Capital Management (DCM) and investors Labrador Ventures and Band of Angels.

Since 2016, it has been a division of IBM. On April 1, 2018, two years after its purchase, Ustream changed its name to IBM Cloud Video to reflect its new ownership, but rapidly changed that name to IBM Watson Media to reflect the embedded artificial intelligence capabilities of IBM's Watson.

Origin

History 
Ustream was born when the founders (John Ham, Brad Hunstable and Gyula Fehér) wanted a way for their friends in the US Army, who were deployed overseas in the Iraq War, to be able to communicate with their families. A product like Ustream would provide them with a way to talk to all of their relatives at once when free time in the war zone was limited.

Ustream was used by politicians such as Hillary Clinton, Barack Obama, John Edwards, to video game streamers, to artists such as Kanye West, Tori Amos and the Plain White T's. Lifecasters such as iJustine and E-TARD The LifeCaster have also used Ustream. The technology community has also adopted Ustream to include Robert Scoble, Leo Laporte and Chris Pirillo.

Acquisition 
Early investors included DCM Ventures and Softbank, the latter of which invested $20  million in 2010 with an option to invest additional capital. On January 21, 2016, IBM acquired Ustream for up to US$150 million. It was combined with Aspera, Clearleap, and Cleversafe to form IBM's Cloud Video [IBM Watson Media] unit. IBM envisioned the use of its technology as part of an enterprise video offering.

Automatic content blocking
IBM Watson Media uses a copyright enforcement service provided by Vobile, which uses a proprietary fingerprinting system to automatically detect copyrighted content. This system has been known to generate false positives, blocking content that should fall under fair use, or which has been specifically licensed by the stream originator. In one such incident, the official livecast of the 2012 Hugo Award ceremony was terminated because it incorporated authorized clips of nominated television shows and movies, causing "a flood of livid Twitter messages". The following day, Ustream apologized for the incident and temporarily disabled automatic blocking while they adjusted the system to "better balance the needs of broadcasters, viewers, and copyright holders".

References

External links

 

2016 mergers and acquisitions
Android (operating system) software
IBM acquisitions
IBM cloud services
Internet properties established in 2007
IOS software
Live streaming services
Video hosting
Video software